Joseph D. Clinton had a long professional association with Buckminster Fuller.  In 1970, Clinton worked in the School of Technology at Southern Illinois University, where Fuller taught, and researched papers on the mathematics involved with geodesics, contracted and published by NASA in 1971.   Some five years later, Clinton founded Clinton International Design Consultants, an interdisciplinary design and consulting firm based on the philosophy of what he termed "the structures field of Design Science."  Clinton’s work has specialised in environmentally sensitive design systems, incorporating elements such as solar and wind structures and systems.  His firm did work contributing to such structures as the Omni Max Theater for Expo 86 in Vancouver, British Columbia, Canada, and the Epcot Center’s Horizon Omnisphere Theater.

References
 Di Carlo, Biagio (May 2008). "The wooden roofs of Leonardo and new structural research". Nexus Network Journal 10 (1). ISSN 1590-5896.
 Fuller, R. Buckminster (1999). Krausse, Joachim; Lichtenstein, Claude. eds. Your private sky: R. Buckminster Fuller, the art of design science. Lars Müller. .

External links
 	Don Michel 'Insight' radio interview with Joe Clinton, August 11, 1966

Living people
Year of birth missing (living people)